Claude Charles Bloch (July 12, 1878 – October 4, 1967) was a United States Navy admiral who served as Commander, Battle Force, U.S. Fleet (COMBATFOR) from 1937 to 1938; and Commander in Chief, U.S. Fleet (CINCUS) from 1938 to 1940.

Early years
Claude C. Bloch was born on July 12, 1878, in Woodbury, Kentucky, to a Jewish family. He went to Ogden College. He was appointed to the United States Naval Academy in Annapolis, Maryland, in 1895 from the Third Congressional District in Kentucky. 

While he was still a cadet, Bloch served aboard battleship  during the battle of Santiago de Cuba. Bloch assisted in the rescue of Spanish sailors from the burning enemy ships and was subsequently awarded with the Specially Meritorious Service Medal. 

He graduated from the Naval Academy on January 28, 1899, with the rank of passed midshipman.

Navy Cross citation
The official U.S. Navy citation for Bloch's Navy Cross reads:

Name: Claude Charles Bloch
Service: Navy
Rank: Captain
Company: Commanding Officer
Division: U.S.S. Plattsburg 
Citation: The President of the United States of America takes pleasure in presenting the Navy Cross to Captain Claude Charles Bloch, United States Navy, for distinguished service in the line of his profession as Commanding Officer of the U.S.S. PLATTSBURG, engaged in the important, exacting and hazardous duty of transporting and escorting troops and supplies to European ports through waters infested with enemy submarines and mines during World War I.

World War II
He served as the Commander-in-Chief, United States Fleet from 1938 to 6 January 1940, as was customary holding the temporary grade of admiral. Following this assignment, he reverted to his permanent grade, rear admiral, and commanded the Fourteenth Naval District at Pearl Harbor at the time of the attack. The two ordered that another ship be sent to investigate. Bloch was cleared of any responsibility for the unpreparedness of the US forces during the attack which was blamed on Admiral Husband E. Kimmel and General Walter Short and Bloch remained as commandant until April 1942.

He later served on the General Board of the Navy from 1942, retiring from the Navy later that year with the rank of admiral. He remained as chairman of the Navy Board for productions awards until the end of World War II and retired in 1946. Bloch was decorated with a Legion of Merit for his World War II service.

He died in Washington, D.C., on 4th October 1967 and was buried in Arlington National Cemetery.

Bloch was the highest ranking Jewish officer in the armed forces until well after World War II.

Decorations
Admiral Claude C. Bloch´s ribbon bar:

References

External links
Claude C. Bloch Orders, 1904–1940 (bulk 1916–1940) MS 365 held by Special Collection & Archives , Nimitz Library  at the United States Naval Academy 

1878 births
1967 deaths
People from Butler County, Kentucky
United States Navy admirals
United States Naval Academy alumni
Naval War College alumni
American military personnel of the Spanish–American War
American military personnel of the Philippine–American War
United States Navy personnel of World War I
United States Navy World War II admirals
Recipients of the Navy Cross (United States)
Recipients of the Legion of Merit
Jewish American military personnel
Burials at Arlington National Cemetery